Moisés Jiménez Sánchez (born 24 December 1960) is a Mexican politician affiliated with the New Alliance Party. As of 2014 he served as Deputy of the LIX Legislature of the Mexican Congress representing Hidalgo (as an independent).

References

1960 births
Living people
Politicians from Hidalgo (state)
New Alliance Party (Mexico) politicians
Deputies of the LIX Legislature of Mexico
Members of the Chamber of Deputies (Mexico) for Hidalgo (state)